The 2001 UAW-GM Quality 500 was the 29th stock car race of the 2001 NASCAR Winston Cup Series and the 42nd iteration of the event. The race was held on Sunday, October 7, 2001, in Concord, North Carolina, at Lowe's Motor Speedway, a 1.5 miles (2.4 km) permanent quad-oval. The race took the scheduled 334 laps to complete. At race's end, Sterling Marlin, driving for Chip Ganassi Racing with Felix Sabates, would dominate the late stages of the race to win his eighth career NASCAR Winston Cup Series victory and his second and final victory of the season. To fill out the podium, Tony Stewart, driving for Joe Gibbs Racing, and Ward Burton, driving for Bill Davis Racing, would finish second and third, respectively.

The race was interrupted from its broadcast on NBC due to then-president George W. Bush announcing the United States invasion of Afghanistan, moving the race to TNT.

Background 

Lowe's Motor Speedway is a motorsports complex located in Concord, North Carolina, United States 13 miles from Charlotte, North Carolina. The complex features a 1.5 miles (2.4 km) quad oval track that hosts NASCAR racing including the prestigious Coca-Cola 600 on Memorial Day weekend and the NEXTEL All-Star Challenge, as well as the UAW-GM Quality 500. The speedway was built in 1959 by Bruton Smith and is considered the home track for NASCAR with many race teams located in the Charlotte area. The track is owned and operated by Speedway Motorsports Inc. (SMI) with Marcus G. Smith (son of Bruton Smith) as track president.

Entry list 

 (R) denotes rookie driver.

Practice 
Originally, three practice sessions were planned to be held, with one on Thursday, October 4, and two on Saturday, October 6. However, due to rain, the AM session on Saturday was cancelled.

First practice 
The first practice session was held on Thursday, October 4, at 3:30 PM EST. The session would last for two hours.

Second and final practice 
The final practice session, sometimes referred to as Happy Hour, was held on Saturday, October 6, at 4:00 PM EST. The session would last for one hour.

Qualifying 
Qualifying was held on Friday, October 4, at 7:00 PM EST. Each driver would have two laps to set a fastest time; the fastest of the two would count as their official qualifying lap. Positions 1-36 would be decided on time, while positions 37-43 would be based on provisionals. Six spots are awarded by the use of provisionals based on owner's points. The seventh is awarded to a past champion who has not otherwise qualified for the race. If no past champ needs the provisional, the next team in the owner points will be awarded a provisional.

Six drivers would fail to qualify: Kyle Petty, Derrike Cope, Jeff Green, Robby Gordon, Buckshot Jones, and Frank Kimmel.

Full qualifying results

Race results

References 

2001 NASCAR Winston Cup Series
NASCAR races at Charlotte Motor Speedway
October 2001 sports events in the United States
2001 in sports in North Carolina